Paul Ryan (born Paul Sapherson; 24 October 1948 – 29 November 1992) was an English singer, songwriter and record producer.

Born in Leeds, West Riding of Yorkshire, England, Paul and his twin brother Barry were the sons of singer Marion Ryan, and had some success as a singing duo during the 1960s, known simply as "Paul & Barry Ryan". However, the stress of public attention caused Paul to retreat into the background, while Barry went solo. Paul Ryan wrote Barry's 1968 hit "Eloise", the 1971 hit "Who Put the Lights Out?" for Dana and another of his songs, "I Will Drink the Wine", was a top-20 hit on the UK Singles Chart for Frank Sinatra.

In the 1970s Ryan relocated to the United States, and in 1976 released an album, Scorpio Rising, but later left the music industry. After returning to the UK in 1985, he earned his living from operating a chain of hairdressing salons.

The gothic punk band the Damned reached number 3 in the UK Singles Chart in 1986 with their cover version of "Eloise".

Ryan died of lung cancer in 1992 in London at the age of 44.

Songwriting credits
"Eloise" – Barry Ryan
"Love Is Love" – Barry Ryan
"Who Put the Lights Out?" – Dana
"I Will Drink the Wine" – Frank Sinatra, Joe Longthorne
"The Colour of My Love" - Dalida, Jefferson, Barry Ryan
"Love's Only Love" – Engelbert Humperdinck
"Sunrise in the Morning" – Frank Sinatra

Both of the above Sinatra tracks appeared on his 1971 album Sinatra & Company.

See also
List of performers on Top of the Pops

References

External links

 

1948 births
1992 deaths
Singers from Leeds
English male singers
English songwriters
English record producers
English twins
Deaths from lung cancer in England
Charisma Records artists
20th-century English singers
20th-century British male singers
British male songwriters